The MDW Light Heavyweight Championship is a professional wrestling light heavyweight championship in Mason-Dixon Wrestling (MDW). It was the original lightweight title of the Atlantic Coast Championship Wrestling promotion during its first year of operation. In December 1998, the promotion became Mason-Dixon Wrestling and the title became the MDW Heavyweight Championship.

The inaugural champion was Joey Austin, who defeated Bobby Kane in Buckhannon, West Virginia on December 13, 1997 to become the first ACCW Light Heavyweight Champion. The Bounty Hunter and Latin Tornado are tied for the record for most reigns, with four each. At 336 days, Puck's first and only reign is the longest in the title's history. Latin Tornado's first reign was the shortest in the history of the title lasting only 1 day. Overall, there have been 13 reigns shared between 7 wrestlers, with three vacancies.

Title history
Key

Names

Reigns

List of combined reigns

Footnotes

References
General

Specific

External links

MDW Light Heavyweight Championship at Cagematch.net
MDW Light Heavyweight Championship at USA Indy Wrestling

Mason-Dixon Wrestling championships
Light heavyweight wrestling championships